This is a list  of all military equipment ever used by the United Kingdom which includes weapons, ships and aircraft. This includes lists of specific types of current and former military equipment of the UK, and military equipment lists for certain periods such as World War II.

Weapons 
 List of all weapons current and former of the United Kingdom

Aircraft 

 List of all aircraft current and former of the United Kingdom
 List of all naval aircraft current and former of the United Kingdom

Ships 

 List of all naval vessels current and former of the United Kingdom
List of equipment in the Royal Navy

World War II 

 List of British military equipment of World War II

References

Equipment,United Kingdom